3043 San Diego, provisional designation , is a stony Hungaria asteroid and slow rotator from the inner regions of the asteroid belt, approximately 4.7 kilometers in diameter.

It was discovered by American astronomer Eleanor Helin on 30 September 1982, at the U.S. Palomar Observatory in California, and named for the city of San Diego.

Classification and orbit 

The bright E-type asteroid is a member of the Hungaria family, which form the innermost dense concentration of asteroids in the Solar System. The asteroid orbits the Sun at a distance of 1.7–2.1 AU once every 2 years and 8 months (977 days). Its orbit has an eccentricity of 0.11 and an inclination of 22° with respect to the ecliptic. The first observation was taken at Crimea–Nauchnij in 1974, extending the asteroid's observation arc by 8 years prior to its discovery.

Slow rotator 

San Diego is a slow rotator. In March 2005, a rotational lightcurve was obtained from photometric observations by American astronomer Brian Warner at his Palmer Divide Observatory in Colorado. It gave a long rotation period of  hours with a brightness variation of 0.60 in magnitude. The period was derived from a re-examined lightcurve that originally gave a much shorter period of  hours with an amplitude of 0.37 in magnitude. This previously published period was only preliminary and is now considered wrong upon re-examination.

Diameter and albedo 

According to the survey carried out by the NEOWISE mission of NASA's Wide-field Infrared Survey Explorer, San Diego measures 4.8 and 5.0 kilometers in diameter and its surface has an albedo of 0.25 and 0.28, respectively, while the Collaborative Asteroid Lightcurve Link  assumes an albedo of 0.30 – a compromise value between 0.4 and 0.2, corresponding to the Hungaria asteroids both as family and orbital group – and calculates a diameter of 4.6 kilometers with an absolute magnitude of 13.7.

Naming 

This minor planet was named for the city of San Diego, California, in appreciation of the city council's efforts to reduce the local light pollution . Palomar mountain is located within San Diego County, California, and the astronomers at the site were concerned that the light pollution from the city would ruin their ability to use the observatory. The council had voted to use Low-Pressure Sodium (LPS) vapor lamps for their street lights. This fixture only emitted light at one wavelength, which astronomers could readily filter out. The approved naming citation was published by the Minor Planet Center on 13 July 1984.

References

Further reading

 Curtis Peebles, Asteroids: A History, 2000, Smithsonian Institution, .

External links 
  
 Lightcurve plot of 3043 San Diego, Palmer Divide Observatory, B. D. Warner (2005)
 Asteroid Lightcurve Database (LCDB), query form (info )
 Dictionary of Minor Planet Names, Google books
 Asteroids and comets rotation curves, CdR – Observatoire de Genève, Raoul Behrend
 Discovery Circumstances: Numbered Minor Planets (1)-(5000) – Minor Planet Center
 
 

003043
Discoveries by Eleanor F. Helin
Named minor planets
003043
19820920